Gosper may refer to:
Gosper County, Nebraska
Gosper curve
Bill Gosper, American mathematician
Kevan Gosper, Australian athlete and 1956 Olympic medalist
John J. Gosper (1843–1913), Nebraska Secretary of State (1873–1875) and Secretary of Arizona Territory (1875–1882).